Aktyuba (Aqtübä) is a rural locality (a village) in Staromusinsky Selsoviet, Karmaskalinsky District, Bashkortostan, Russia. The population was 103 as of 2010. There are 3 streets.

Geography 
Aktyuba is located 23 km west of Karmaskaly (the district's administrative centre) by road. Akkul is the nearest rural locality.

References 

Rural localities in Karmaskalinsky District